The Great Conspiracy was a year-long state of war and disorder that occurred near the end of Roman Britain. The historian Ammianus Marcellinus described it as a barbarica conspiratio, which capitalised on a depleted military force in the province that had been brought about by Magnentius' losses at the Battle of Mursa Major in Pannonia after his unsuccessful bid to become emperor.

It is difficult to ascertain the exact chronology of the events because their main source, Ammianus, was living in Antioch at that time. His information looks second-hand and confused and is in addition inconsistent with that produced by other sources. As a consequence, there are several different views of what happened.

Conspiracy
In the winter of 367, the Roman garrison on Hadrian's Wall apparently rebelled and allowed Picts from Caledonia to enter Britannia. Simultaneously, Attacotti, the Scotti from Hibernia and Saxons from Germania landed in what might have been coordinated and pre-arranged waves on the island's mid-western and southeastern borders, respectively. Franks and Saxons also landed in northern Gaul.

The warbands managed to overwhelm nearly all of the loyal Roman outposts and settlements. The entire western and northern areas of Britannia were overwhelmed; the cities sacked; and the civilian Romano-British murdered, raped, or enslaved. 

Nectaridus, the comes maritime tractus (commanding general of the sea coast region), was killed, and the Dux Britanniarum, Fullofaudes, was either besieged or captured. The remaining loyal army units stayed garrisoned inside southeastern cities.

The miles areani, the local Roman agents who provided intelligence on barbarian movements, seem to have betrayed their paymasters for bribes, which made the attacks completely unexpected. Deserting soldiers and escaped slaves roamed the countryside and turned to robbery to support themselves. Although the chaos was widespread and initially concerted, the rebels had aims simply of personal enrichment and worked as small bands rather than larger armies.

The historian Ian Hughes later argued that it is likely Nectaridus and Fullofaudes were killed by Saxon and Frankish raiders along the coast of Gaul, rather than by enemies in Britain, but Hughes's account lacks historical evidence.

Roman response

Early attempts
Emperor Valentinian I was campaigning against the Alamanni at the time and so was unable to respond personally. A series of commanders to act in his stead were chosen but swiftly recalled. 

The first was Severus, the emperor's comes domesticorum, who was soon recalled and replaced by Jovinus, the magister equitum. Jovinus then wrote back to Valentinian requesting reinforcements. The Emperor recalled Jovinus, probably to take part in a campaign along the Rhine, which was a higher priority, and then sent out Flavius Theodosius.

Alternative chronology
The historian Ian Hughes later argued that Severus and Jovinus were never actually sent to Britain since it is unlikely that they would go all that way and come back. He proposed the following alternative chronology:
June 367 – Valentinian is informed of Saxon and Frankish raids along the coast of Gaul that have resulted in the deaths of Nectaridus and Fullofaudes;
 Severus is given a small force and ordered to gather information and counter the Saxon and Frankish raids;
 Valentinian moves to Amiens in order to gather intelligence and co-ordinate a response to the attacks;
 Severus returns with information that more troops are needed to restore order;
 Jovinus is ordered to the coast and begins repelling attackers;
 Jovinus passes word to the Emperor that Britain is under attack and that he needs more troops to cross the Channel and to restore the situation;
 Valentinian decides to assemble a force under Theodosius for the attack.

Arrival of Theodosius
In the spring of 368, a relief force, commanded by Flavius Theodosius, gathered at Bononia (Boulogne-sur-Mer). It included four units, Batavi, Heruli,  Iovii and Victores, as well as his son, the later Emperor Theodosius I, and probably the later usurper Magnus Maximus, his nephew. 

Theodosius took advantage of a break in the winter weather to cross the Channel to Richborough, which left the rest of his troops at Bononia to await better weather. That enabled Theodosius to gather vital intelligence. He discovered that the British troops had been overwhelmed, refused to fight, or deserted, and many may not have been paid.

Once the troops had landed, Theodosius marched with them to Londinium, which he made his base. There, he began to deal with the invaders:

An amnesty was promised to deserters, which enabled Theodosius to regarrison abandoned forts. A new Dux Britanniarum was appointed, Dulcitius, with Civilis granted vicarius status to head a new civilian administration.

After discovering that the local areani had collaborated with the invaders, Theodosius removed them from their positions.

By the end of the year, the barbarians had been driven back to their homelands; the mutineers had been executed; Hadrian's Wall had been retaken and order had returned to the diocese. Under Civilis' rule the last of the earlier invaders were temporarily driven out in AD 369, possibly using troops under his own personal command, and a programme of civil restoration begun.
 
Theodosius also overcame and defeated the force of Valentinus, a Pannonian who had been exiled to Britain and joined the invaders.

Considerable reorganization was undertaken in Britain, including the creation of a new province, Valentia, probably to better address the state of the far north. The poet Claudian suggests that naval activity took place in northern Britain. 

It is possible that Theodosius mounted punitive expeditions against the barbarians and extracted terms from them. Certainly, the Notitia Dignitatum later records four units of Attacotti serving Rome on the Continent. The areani were removed from duty and the frontiers refortified with co-operation from border tribes such as the Votadini, which marked the career of men such as Paternus.

Political effects
Theodosius returned to Rome a hero and was made senior military advisor to Valentinian to replace Jovinus. A decade later, his son became emperor.

The Romans had ended much of the chaos, but raids by all of the people listed above continued.

Fictional references
Fictional accounts of the Great Conspiracy were featured in Wallace Breem's historical novel Eagle in the Snow, Peter Vansittart's historical novel Three Six Seven: Memoirs of a Very Important Man, Stephen R. Lawhead's fantasy novel Taliesin, M. J. Trow's Britannia series, Jack Whyte's fantasy-historical novel The Skystone, and Mark Chadbourn's novel Pendragon, written under the pen-name James Wilde.

The author Francis Hagan utilises the Great Conspiracy as the backdrop for his trilogy of books, the Sabinus Chronicles (The Unquiet Shore, The Reaping of the Sea and The Vengeful Tide). In the novels a former Tribune, Sabinus, brings Roman and Barbarian forces together to save Rome from itself.

References

Bibliography

External links
The Barbarian Conspiracy at British History
The Great Conspiracy at The History of Rome Podcast

367
368
Military history of Roman Britain
Valentinianic dynasty
Wars involving the Roman Empire
4th-century conflicts
Wars involving Germanic peoples
4th century in Roman Britain
360s in the Roman Empire